James Montgomery Bailey (September 25, 1841 – March 4, 1894) was an American journalist who won an ephemeral popularity as the "Danbury News Man."

Biography
He was born at Albany, New York, and after receiving a common school education, learned the trade of a carpenter.  He removed to Danbury, Conn., in 1860, and worked at his trade for the two following years, but found time to write occasionally for the newspapers.  During the Civil War he served in the Seventeenth Connecticut Volunteers.  In 1870 he established the Danbury News, for which he wrote the humorous sketches, sometimes original, often simply descriptive of commonplace happenings, which won for him a national reputation and made his paper known throughout the country.  An example of his ability to humorously depict domestic situations is ‘Putting Up A Stovepipe’, in which he described the husband/wife tensions caused by an unpleasant household chore.  His first book. Life in Danbury, was published in 1873; it consisted of selections from his newspaper articles.  His other publications were The Danbury News Man's Almanac (1873); They All Do It (1877); England from a Back Window (1878); Mr. Phillip's Goneness (1879); The Danbury Boom; with a Full Account of Mr. Cobleigh's Action Therein (1880); and History of Danbury, Conn., 1684-1896.

References

External links

 
 Putting Up a Stovepipe – a humorous sketch referenced above.

1841 births
1894 deaths
Writers from Albany, New York
American humorists
19th-century American newspaper publishers (people)
Union Army soldiers
People of Connecticut in the American Civil War
19th-century American newspaper founders
19th-century American journalists
American male journalists
Military personnel from Connecticut
19th-century American male writers
Journalists from New York (state)